The Bogotá International Film Festival or BIFF is an annual international film festival held in Bogotá, Colombia.

Premio del Público Air France-KLM winners

References

External links

Festivals in Bogotá
Culture in Bogotá
Film festivals in Colombia
Film festivals established in 2015
2015 establishments in Colombia